The 2022–23 CAF Confederation Cup (officially the 2022–23 TotalEnergies CAF Confederation Cup for sponsorship reasons) is the 20th edition  of Africa's secondary club football tournament organized by the Confederation of African Football (CAF), under the current CAF Confederation Cup title after the merger of CAF Cup and African Cup Winners' Cup.

The winners will automatically qualify for the 2023–24 CAF Confederation Cup, and also earn the right to play against the winners of the 2022–23 CAF Champions League in the 2023 CAF Super Cup.

RS Berkane are the defending champions, but were eliminated in the playoff round by US Monastir.

Association team allocation
All 56 CAF member associations may enter the CAF Confederation Cup, with the 12 highest ranked associations according to their CAF 5-Year Ranking eligible to enter two teams in the competition. As a result, theoretically a maximum of 68 teams could enter the tournament (plus 16 teams eliminated from the CAF Champions League which enter the play-off round) – although this level has never been reached.

For the 2022–23 CAF Confederation Cup, the CAF uses the 2017–2022 CAF 5-Year Ranking, which calculates points for each entrant association based on their clubs’ performance over those 5 years in the CAF Champions League and CAF Confederation Cup. The criteria for points are the following:

The points are multiplied by a coefficient according to the year as follows:
2021–22: x 5
2020–21: × 4
2019–20: × 3
2018–19: × 2
2018: × 1

Teams

The following 50 teams from 39 associations entered the competition.
Teams in bold received a bye to the second round.
The other teams entered the first round.

Associations are shown according to their 2018–2022 CAF 5-Year Ranking – those with a ranking score have their rank and score (in parentheses) indicated.

 Associations which did not enter a team

Notes:

Schedule

Qualifying rounds

First round

Second round

Playoff round

Group stage

In the group stage, each group will be played on a home-and-away round-robin basis. The winners and runners-up of each group will advance to the quarter-finals of the knockout stage.

Group A

Group B

Group C

Group D

Knockout stage

Top goalscorers

See also
2022–23 CAF Champions League
2023 CAF Super Cup

References

External links
CAFonline.com

1
1